Pope Marinus II (died May 946) was the bishop of Rome and ruler of the Papal States from 30 October 942 to his death. He has also been mistakenly called Martinus III. He ruled during the Saeculum obscurum. He was also erroneously called Martin III leading to the second pope named Martin taking the name Martin IV.

Early career
Marinus was born in Rome, and prior to becoming pope he was attached to the Church of Saint Cyriacus in the Baths of Diocletian. He was said to have encountered Ulrich of Augsburg on his visit to Rome in 909, and reportedly predicted Ulrich's eventual appointment as bishop of Augsburg.

Pontificate
Marinus was elevated to the papacy on 30 October 942 through intervention of Alberic II of Spoleto. This period is known as Saeculum obscurum due to the power of Alberic and his relatives over the popes. Marinus concentrated on administrative aspects of the papacy, and sought to reform both the secular and regular clergy. He extended the appointment of Archbishop Frederick of Mainz as papal vicar and missus dominicus throughout Germany and Francia. Marinus later intervened when the bishop of Capua seized without authorization a church which had been given to the local Benedictine monks. In fact, throughout his pontificate, Marinus favoured various monasteries, issuing a number of bulls in their favour.

Marinus occupied the palace built by Pope John VII atop the Palatine Hill in the ruins of the Domus Gaiana. He died in May 946 and was succeeded by Agapetus II.

Name
Because of the similarity of the names Marinus and Martinus, Marinus I and Marinus II were, in some sources, mistakenly called Martinus II and Martinus III.

Notes

References
 Mann, Horace K., The Lives of the Popes in the Early Middle Ages, Vol. IV: The Popes in the Days of Feudal Anarchy, 891-999 (1910)

External links
Opera Omnia by Migne Patrologia Latina with analytical indexes

Popes
Italian popes
946 deaths
Year of birth unknown
10th-century popes
Burials at St. Peter's Basilica